NGC 6638 is a globular cluster in the constellation Sagittarius. It is magnitude 9.5 and diameter 2 arc minutes, class VI. It is a half degree east of Lambda Sagittarii. It is a member of the Milky Way.

The globular cluster was discovered in 1784 by the astronomer William Herschel with his 18.7-inch telescope and the discovery was later entered in the New General Catalogue.

References

 Robert Burnham, Jr, Burnham's Celestial Handbook: An observer's guide to the universe beyond the solar system, vol 3, p.1557

External links
 
 NGC 6638

Globular clusters
Sagittarius (constellation)
6638